The Leamside Line, originally part of the Durham Junction Railway, is a disused railway line, located in the North East of England. The Leamside Line closed to passenger traffic in 1964, under the Beeching cuts.

History
The first section of the Leamside Line was opened in August 1838, by the Durham Junction Railway, between Washington on the Stanhope and Tyne Railway, and Rainton Meadows.

In September 1843, the Durham Junction Railway was acquired by the Newcastle and Darlington Junction Railway ahead of the opening of the company's planned route between Newcastle and Darlington. The planned route involved operating over the existing alignment, owned by the Durham Junction Railway, which was operating at a loss, and therefore unable to upgrade the track. Upon completion, passenger services commenced in June 1844, between Darlington and Greenesfield, near Gateshead. The station at Greenesfield was subsequently closed, following the opening of Newcastle, in August 1850.

The line between Washington and Pelaw was opened in September 1849, by the York, Newcastle and Berwick Railway – the successor of the Newcastle and Darlington Junction Railway. Prior to the opening of this line, trains traveled via .

The stone arch Victoria Viaduct, constructed between 1836 and 1838, is inspired by the design of the Alcántara Bridge in Spain.

The Leamside Line constituted part of the original East Coast Main Line route from London to Edinburgh, until 1872, eventually being incorporated into the North Eastern Railway. The line's main source of revenue, as with most of the early railways, was mineral traffic, principally coal from the Durham Coalfield. The line was linked to many private colliery branch lines and waggonways.

Thereafter, the Leamside Line continued to carry local passenger services and freight traffic, as well as serving as a diversionary route from the East Coast Main Line.

This marked the line's closure to passenger traffic, which occurred contemporaneously with the Penshaw–Sunderland line.

Ferryhill station, being at the junction with the modern East Coast Main Line remained open for a further three years, closing to passengers in March 1967. The station closed to goods in the 1980s. Coal and other freight continued to be carried for some years but declined due to the gradual demise of the Durham Coalfield between the 1970s and 1990s. In the late-1980s the line was used at weekends for East Coast Main Line trains that were diverted due to electrification of the line between Newcastle and Darlington, especially in 1989 to avoid Durham when there was a major remodeling of the track through Durham station.

In the early 1990s, and following the closure of the Freightliner terminal at Follingsby, near Wardley, the Leamside Line was mothballed almost entirely – the terminal being the recipient of most of the line's traffic during the final years of operation. A short section of the Leamside Line from Pelaw Junction remained in operation, serving the open-cast coal mine at Wardley, which has also since closed.

After closure
Following the line's closure in the early 1990s, the double track was reduced to a single line in some places, with the track severed at some level crossings along the line. Initially, the line's engineering features remained intact. Substantial parts of the line and infrastructure were also missing from around the former station at Usworth, which has also become severely overgrown.

In January 2003, a large section of track, located to the south of Penshaw, was stolen over a six-day period. The line is currently safeguarded from development, with no sales of land attached to the line.

The former Freightliner terminal at Follingsby, near Wardley, is currently under development, with plans to construct an Amazon warehouse and fulfilment centre – leading to the potential creation of over 1,000 jobs. The site of the former open-cast coal mine at Wardley is also now under private development.

Proposed re-opening, upgrade and development
Since the line's closure in the early 1990s, a number of proposals to re-open the Leamside Line have been put forward, including plans by AECOM, ATOC, Durham County Council, Railtrack and Tyne and Wear PTE. The line has been considered for a number of potential uses, including a regional suburban rail service linking Tyneside and Teesside, a diversionary freight route for the East Coast Main Line, and an extension to the Tyne and Wear Metro network.

Part of the Durham to Sunderland Line, which diverged from the Leamside Line to the south-east of the Victoria Viaduct, re-opened in March 2002, following the Tyne and Wear Metro's extension to Wearside. In early 2020, discussions between councils began, looking into the potential extension of the Tyne and Wear Metro network to the International Advanced Manufacturing Park in Washington, using the former alignment of the Leamside Line.

In March 2020, a bid was made to the Restoring Your Railway fund to get funds for a feasibility study into reinstating the line. This bid was unsuccessful.

Since being elected in 2019 the North of Tyne Mayor, Jamie Driscoll, has campaigned for the reopening of the line.

References

External links

Durham Junction Railway
Memorandum by The City of Sunderland (COA 17)
Newcastle and Darlington Junction Railway
Railways and Waggonways in County Durham

Railway lines opened in 1839
Closed railway lines in North East England